Assel may refer to:

Assel, Gelderland, a hamlet in the Netherlands
Assel, Luxembourg, a village in Luxembourg
Assel River, a river in Russia